This is a list of fictional non-human primates in comics. It is a subsidiary to the list of fictional primates.

References

Comics
Primates